Luuk Tinbergen (7 September 1915, in The Hague – 1 September 1955, in Groningen) was a Dutch ornithologist and ecologist.

Tinbergen was the youngest of three eminent brothers — both Jan and Nikolaas won Nobel Prizes, for economics and physiology or medicine, respectively.

He was appointed in 1949 by Gerard Baerends to the University of Groningen, where he developed important concepts in ethology.  He was influenced to specialize in ethology by ethologist brother Niko with whom he was very close, but he also was influenced by Jan to introduce a level of quantitative analysis not previously utilized in ethology.  Tinbergen committed suicide in 1955 at the age of 39.  Tijs Tinbergen, his elder son, is a nature film director (imdb), whose 1994 film Gebiologeerd ("mesmerised") is a homage to his father . Tinbergen's younger son, Joost Tinbergen, is also a biologist.

University of Groningen alumni
1915 births
1955 deaths
Dutch ornithologists
Scientists from The Hague
20th-century Dutch zoologists
1955 suicides